Latino theatre presents a wide range of aesthetic approaches, dramatic structures, and themes, ranging from love, romance, immigration, border politics, nation building, incarceration, and social justice. Whether of a linguistic, ethnic, political, cultural or sexual nature, the plays often have a social justice component involving Latino people living in the United States. The Oxcart by René Marqués, Marisol by José Rivera (playwright), and In the Heights by Lin-Manuel Miranda are examples of staged Broadway plays. There is also a strong tradition of Latino avant-garde and absurdist theatre, which double as political satires; prime examples include The Masses are Asses by Pedro Pietri and United States of Banana by Giannina Braschi.

Spanish language theater companies and in Latino theater festivals in the United States present Spanish, Spanglish, English language plays in major American cities, including New York, Chicago, Tucson, Seattle, Denver.

Assimilation in Latino/Hispanic Theatre 
In the early 20th century, adaptation, and assimilation of Latino immigrants to the United States, and the use of their own version of their language in America, began to translate into the written work of Latino theatre. One of the first mainstream plays that was written about the Latino culture and immigration experience in the United States was The Oxcart by René Marqués. The Oxcart dramatizes the conflicts between Puerto Rican belonging and displacement on the mainland. 21st century Puerto Rican and Nuyorican dramatic works address not only American culture but the actual formation of the United States government. Examples are the Broadway musical Hamilton (musical) by Lin-Manuel Miranda, which tells the story of the American revolution in 1776, and the postcolonial experimental United States of Banana by Giannina Braschi who dramatizes the collapse of the American empire on September 11, 2001.

The theatre historian Jorge Huerta writes "...you cannot analyze or write about Latina/o theater without also sounding like a sociologist, a political scientist, an ethnographer, etc., because these are all vital discourses in the understanding of our cultures as Latinas and Latinos." He distinguishes the theaters of the three major Latina/o groupsthe Chicanas/os, Cuban-Americans and Puerto Ricansin terms of the history of relations of the three groups with the United States, emphasizing the similarities and differences in their experiences.

Among the Chicano playwrights of note is Luis Alfaro wrote play Oedipus El Rey  at The Public Theater reset Oedipus Rex in South Central LA with a Latino Oedipus. Alfaro also adapted Sophocles’ Elektra, which he transformed into Electricidad, a story about a SoCal drug lord. Euripides’ Medea became Mojada: A Medea in Los Angeles. Cherríe Moraga writes feminist theater, including Watsonville/Circle in the Dirt (2002) and The Hungry Woman (2001).

Born of a Jewish father and Puerto Rican mother, Quiara Alegría Hudes has written many plays, including The Good Peaches and The Happiest Song Plays Last. Among her most successful works are the book for the musical In the Heights (finalist for the 2008 Pulitzer Prize for Drama) and Water by the Spoonful (for which she won the 2012 Pulitzer Prize for Drama). Her play Elliot, A Soldier's Fugue was a finalist for the 2007 Pulitzer Prize for Drama.

Other Latino theater artists include Evelina Fernández, Dolores Prida, Ilan Stavans, María Irene Fornés, Cherríe Moraga, Caridad Svich, Quiara Alegría Hudes, Jorge Ignacio Cortiñas, Tanya Saracho, and Octavio Solis. Their works address histories of oppression, political and economic status, cultural nationalism, third world solidarity, multiculturalism—and their many discontents.

Ethnic and racial stereotyping

Misrepresentation: staged racism 
Concerns over ethnic stereotyping and racism have recurred, in the misrepresentation of Latino people in works such as West Side Story, which was written by non-Latino artists. There are also controversies about the assignment of Latino theater roles to non-Latino actors.

Latino peoples and cultures have frequently been portrayed on stage as being violent, rivalrous, exotic, and not wanting to adapt. Many consider the musical West Side Story an example of Puerto Rican stereotypes; much future racist discussion about Puerto Ricans and other Latinos stemmed from this musical. The musical was written by non-Latinos: the book was by Arthur Laurents, the music was written by Leonard Bernstein, and lyrics were written by Stephen Sondheim. Many believe that the underlying message is that Latino culture is dangerous and must be policed and controlled.

Casting 
Latinos have often found it difficult to be cast in roles that have not been specifically written to be played by a Latino. Many casting directors have begun to use the term "color blind" casting; however, this has caused controversy, as if a show is cast improperly with certain races in certain roles, it may be perceived by audiences as well as the theatre community as wrong or racist. Actors seek theater producer's statements that there will be no discrimination in the casting process. Nevertheless, there have been films, TV shows, and plays that have been written for Latino actors, but played by non-Latino actors. An example of this is TheaterWorks' production of The Motherf**ker With the Hat.

Latino playwrights and directors
 
Luis Alfaro
 Giannina Braschi
 María Julia Casanova
 Susana Cook
 José Corrales
 Nilo Cruz
 María Irene Fornés
Gabriel García Márquez
 Anne García-Romero
Quiara Alegría Hudes
C. Julian Jiménez
 Carlos Lacámara
 René Marqués (The Oxcart)
 Manuel Martín Jr.
 Lin-Manuel Miranda
 Cherríe Moraga
 Manuel Pereiras García
 Pedro Pietri
 Dolores Prida
 José Rivera (Marisol)
 María Ruiz de Burton
 Luis Rafael Sánchez
 Luis Santeiro
 Héctor Santiago
 Caridad Svich
 Luis Valdez
 Rosario Vargas (Aguijón Theater)

Latino plays and musicals 
The Capeman
 Elliot, A Soldier's Fugue (Pulitzer Finalist)
 Four Guys Named Jose and Una Mujer Named Maria
Hamilton
 In the Heights
 Kiss of the Spider Woman
Marisol
La Pasión según Antígona Pérez, a tragedy based on the life of Olga Viscal Garriga
 The Oxcart/La Carreta
 On Your Feet
United States of Banana 
 Water by the Spoonful (2012 Pulitzer)
 West Side Story
Watsonville (2002)
The Hungry Woman (2001)

See also 
 Aguijón Theater
 Borderlands Theater
 Latino Theater Company
 Hispanic Organization of Latin Actors
 INTAR Theatre
 Puerto Rican Literature
 Latino Literature
 Puerto Rican Traveling Theater
 Teatro Puerto Rico

Notes

General references 
 Godinez, Henry. "So Many Stories To Tell." American Theatre 20.10 (2003): 48–52. International Bibliography of Theatre & Dance with Full Text. Web. 13 Mar. 2016.
 Graham-Jones, Jean. "Comment: On Attributions, Appropriations, Misinterpretations, And Latin American Theatre Studies." Theatre Journal 56.3 (2004): 347–351. Academic Search Premier. Web. 13 Mar. 2016.
 Horwitz, Siml. "Latino Theatre Artists: Opportunity And Challenge." Back Stage 42.31 (2001): 20. International Bibliography of Theatre & Dance with Full Text. Web. 13 Mar. 2016.
 Horwitz, Simi. "New Perspectives." Back Stage 44.12 (2003): 24. International Bibliography of Theatre & Dance with Full Text. Web. 13 Mar. 2016.
 Huerta, Jorge A. "Latino Theater Alliance/L.A. Encuentro 2013: We've Come A Long Way, Baby!." Gestos: Revista De Teoría Y Práctica Del Teatro Hispánico 28.56 (2013): 169–170. International Bibliography of Theatre & Dance with Full Text. Web. 13 Mar. 2016.
 Nestor, Frank. "Colorblindness And Controversy." Back Stage (19305966) 53.3 (2012): 2–3. International Bibliography of Theatre & Dance with Full Text. Web. 13 Mar. 2016.
 Svich, Caridad. "US Polyglot Latino Theatre And Its Link To The Americas 1." Contemporary Theatre Review 16.2 (2006): 189–197. Academic Search Premier. Web. 13 Mar. 2016.
 Tolkoff, Esther. "Not A Subculture: NYC's Thriving Latino Theatre." Back Stage 41.10 (2000): 5. International Bibliography of Theatre & Dance with Full Text. Web. 13 Mar. 2016.
 Valdez, Luis. "Chapter 77: Notes On Chicano Theater (1972)." Twentieth Century Theatre: A Sourcebook. 315–319. n.p.: Taylor & Francis Ltd / Books, 1995. International Bibliography of Theatre & Dance with Full Text. Web. 13 Mar. 2016.

Theatre in the United States
Hispanic and Latino American culture